The 1897 Washington football team was an American football team that represented the University of Washington during the 1897 college football season. In its first season under coach Carl L. Clemans, the team compiled a 1–2 record and was outscored by its opponents by a combined total of 26 to 16. For the consecutive year, Jack Lindsay was the team captain.

Schedule

References

Washington
Washington Huskies football seasons
Washington football